Nobody Else but Me is a studio album by American saxophonist Stan Getz, recorded in 1964 but not released until 1994, because of "the enormous success of Getz's Brazilian music" at the time.

Track listing
"Summertime" (George Gershwin, Ira Gershwin, DuBose Heyward) – 7:00
"6-Nix-Quix-Flix" (Gary Burton) – 6:28
"Here's That Rainy Day" (Jimmy Van Heusen, Johnny Burke) – 5:09
"Waltz for a Lovely Wife" (Phil Woods) – 6:51
"Out of Focus" (Gary Burton) – 7:09
"Nobody Else but Me" (Jerome Kern, Oscar Hammerstein II) – 4:13
"Sweet Sorrow" (Michael Gibbs) – 6:06
"Little Girl Blue" (Richard Rodgers, Lorenz Hart) – 3:41
"What Is This Thing Called Love?" (Cole Porter) – 4:26
"Waltz for a Lovely Wife" [Single Version] – 3:10

Personnel
Stan Getz – tenor saxophone
Gary Burton – vibraphone
Gene Cherico – bass
Joe Hunt – drums

References 

1994 albums
Albums produced by Creed Taylor
Albums recorded at Van Gelder Studio
Stan Getz albums
Verve Records albums